Union is the debut album by American singer-songwriter Toni Childs. Released in 1988, the album peaked at number 63 in the US (where it has since been certified Gold for sales of over 500,000 copies). It also peaked at number one in New Zealand, where it was certified 5× Platinum (75,000 copies sold). Four singles were released from the album: "Stop Your Fussin'", "Don't Walk Away", "Walk and Talk Like Angels", and "Zimbabwae". "Stop Your Fussin'" reached the top 20 in Australia, New Zealand, and Germany while "Don't Walk Away" became Childs' only single to chart in the United States, reaching number 72 there.

The album was recorded in London, Paris, and Swaziland. Childs' collaborated with David Ricketts and David Baerwald (who recorded the 1986 album Boomtown as David + David) in the writing and production of the album. Time Magazine described Union as an album that "catches the sweet, scary feelings, all the uncertainty and release, that can come when the sun goes down", and "a diary of dashed love and stubborn hope set into layers of melody that will never let the memory loose". Following its release, Childs was nominated for two Grammy Awards for 'Best New Artist' and for 'Best Rock Vocal Performance (Female)' for the single "Don't Walk Away".

Track listing
All songs written by Toni Childs and David Ricketts except as indicated.

"Don't Walk Away" (Childs, Phil Ramacon) 4:00
"Walk and Talk Like Angels" 5:48
"Stop Your Fussin" 4:40
"Dreamer" 5:01
"Let the Rain Come Down" (Childs, Ricketts, David Batteau) 4:51
"Zimbabwae" 6:18
"Hush" (Childs) 4:04
"Tin Drum" 5:41
"Where's the Ocean" (Childs) 4:42

Personnel
Toni Childs – vocals, guitar, bass
David Ricketts – bass, guitar, keyboard, drum programs
Rick Marotta – drums
Alex Acuña – percussion
Hans Christian – cello
Paul Hanson – bassoon
Gary Barlough – synthesizers, synclavier programs
George Lee – saxophone, percussion
Steve Hogarth – keyboards
David Rhodes – guitar
Alex Weir – guitar
Dann Huff – guitar
Gary Barnacle, Pete Thoms, John Thirkell – horns

Charts

Weekly charts

Year-end charts

Certifications

References

1988 debut albums
Toni Childs albums
A&M Records albums
Albums produced by David Tickle